Task Force 16 (TF16) was one of the most storied task forces in the United States Navy, a major participant in a number of the most important battles of the Pacific War.

It was formed in mid-February 1942 around Enterprise (CV-6), with Vice Admiral William F. Halsey in command of the force, and supported by cruisers Salt Lake City (CA-25) and Northampton (CA-26), along with a half-dozen destroyers.

The task force's first mission was to shell Wake Island and Marcus Island, then, joined by Hornet (CV-8) and the rest of Task Force 18 (TF18), in April the force conducted the Doolittle Raid on Tokyo. In May Halsey was ordered to join Task Force 17 (TF17) in the Coral Sea, but the Battle of the Coral Sea was over before TF 16 could join in.

Halsey was then hospitalized with a skin disease, so Rear Admiral Raymond A. Spruance took over TF 16 and along with TF 17, led it to victory in the Battle of Midway.

In August, the task force supported the landings on Guadalcanal, then fought in the Battle of the Eastern Solomons, followed by the great Battle of the Santa Cruz Islands in October, the Naval Battle of Guadalcanal in November, and covered the retreat of TF 18 after the Battle of Rennell Island.

In March 1943, TG 16.6 fought the Battle of the Komandorski Islands, then bombarded Attu in April, and the whole force supported the recapture of the Aleutians in the Battle of Attu.

In 1944 and 1945, the task force was a refueling unit consisting of destroyer escorts and oilers.

References

Books

Web

United States Navy task forces
Battle of Midway